Pershore railway station is a railway station serving both the town of Pershore and village of Pinvin in Worcestershire, England. The station is on a single-track section of the Cotswold Line. The station and all trains serving it are operated by Great Western Railway.

History
The station was opened as part of the Oxford, Worcester and Wolverhampton Railway on 1 May 1852.

In 1964, British Rail put forward a plan to close 18 stations on the Stratford-upon-Avon to Worcester, and Oxford to Worcester line, including the station at Pershore, citing an annual loss on these routes of £59,000. There was significant opposition to these proposals.

British Rail put forward a new plan in 1967 to withdraw passenger services between Stratford, Evesham and Worcester, and close Pershore and Honeybourne stations. Demolition had started by January 1968 when Pershore Parish Council complained to Sir Gerald Nabarro. The Minister for Transport, Richard Marsh intervened, and agreed that the station would not close, but would remain open as an unstaffed halt in the interest of dozens of commuters who travelled daily to Worcester. The service to be provided was one train in the morning and another in the evening.

The station is the subject of a poem by John Betjeman called Pershore Station or A Liverish Journey First Class.

Stationmasters

Joseph Lawrence 1853 - 1858
William Robbins Russell ca. 1861
Thomas Wainwright 1866  - 1868 (formerly station master at Campden, afterwards station master at Droitwich)
Samuel Partridge Hunt 1868 - 1875 (formerly station master at Bourton, afterwards station master at Stourport)
Thomas Clark Barnes 1877  - 1888
Henry Goodyear 1888 - 1904
Henry Jakeways 1904 - 1927
John Mann 1927 - 1932 (formerly station master at Llantarnam)
Frederick Percy Tredwell 1932 - 1938 (afterwards station master at Evesham)
William Frank Upstone 1938 - 1943 (formerly station master at Littleton and Badsey)
Frederick Darke ca. 1960

Services
Great Western Railway operate all services at Pershore. The off-peak service in trains per hour is:
 1 tph to London Paddington

Notes

External links

Railway stations in Worcestershire
DfT Category F1 stations
Former Great Western Railway stations
Railway stations in Great Britain opened in 1852
Railway stations served by Great Western Railway
1852 establishments in England
Pershore